Lee Stocking Island is an island in the Bahamas, located in the district of Exuma.

The island was host to a marine research facility from 1984 to 2012, which was connected to NOAA. Stromatolites are found offshore of the island.

References

Islands of the Bahamas